Saudades is an album by Brazilian jazz percussionist Naná Vasconcelos recorded in 1979 and released on the ECM label.

Reception
The Allmusic review by John Storm Roberts awarded the album 4½ stars, stating, "This 1979 recording is probably Afro-experimentalist Vasconcelos' finest. It presents his various facets berimbao playing, intricate overlain vocals, fine percussion, even gorgeous guitar simply and almost overwhelmingly. This is one of those performances that remind one to never let natural dogmatism get too out of hand".

Track listing
All compositions by Naná Vasconcelos except as indicated
 "O Berimbau" - 18:58   
 "Vozes (Saudades)" - 3:14   
 "Ondas (Na Óhlos De Petronila)" - 7:53   
 "Cego Aderaldo" (Egberto Gismonti) - 10:32   
 "Dado" - 3:36  
Recorded at Tonstudio Bauer in Ludwigsburg, West Germany in March 1979

Personnel
Naná Vasconcelos — berimbau, percussion, gongs, voice
Egberto Gismonti — guitar
Stuttgart Radio Symphony Orchestra conducted by Mladen Gutesha

References

ECM Records albums
Naná Vasconcelos albums
1980 albums
Albums produced by Manfred Eicher